"Miss You" is a song by English singer-songwriter Gabrielle Aplin. It was released through Aplin's record label Never Fade Records on 9 November 2016, as the lead single from her fifth extended play of the same name. The song was written by Aplin and Liz Horsman, and produced by Mike Spencer and Horsman.

Music video
A music video to accompany the release of "Miss You" was first released onto YouTube on 21 November 2016.

Charts

Release history

References

External links
 
 
 

2016 songs
2016 singles
Gabrielle Aplin songs
Songs written by Gabrielle Aplin